Trackers is a series of untitled books written by Patrick Carman. The books appear to be an interview with Detective Ganz. and Adam sitting in a room on Tuesday, August 12, which is most likely in 2009.

Synopsis
The first book, Trackers is about four friends with an acute sense for technology who form a team called the Trackers. They usually do field tests with their newly high-tech technology. At the same time, the team is infiltrated and, in a rush to try and capture the perpetrator, find a not well-known association; the ISD, the Internet Security Directive. Formed to take down Shantorian, a hacker once in their ranks, the ISDl literally begs the Trackers to join them. At the end of the book, the Trackers are confused as to whether to join the ISD.

The second book, Shantorian, was released in 2011 and is possibly the final book in the series.

Trackers
The story begins in medias res, with Adam Henderson being interrogated by Inspector H. Ganz, a member of an unidentified government agency. After confirming with Ganz that the interrogation is being recorded, Adam decides to give them 
the "whole story," which with his "videographic" memory is very detailed. This causes the inspector to believe that he might be making it up (which is untrue and rebutted after he shows video evidence.).

Missions 
 Training Mission (Code TM101)
 Code ADAM - with the game Chromatix
 Code LEWIS - with the game Memory Maze
 Code EMILY - with the game Glyph Warp
 Code FINN - with the game Glyph Smash

See also

References 

Series of books
Internet broadcasting
Literature articles needing expert attention
Fiction about photography
Theft in fiction
Transmedia storytelling